The Telegraf was a local weekly newspaper published in Baltimore, Maryland. The newspaper ran for 42 years, from February 20, 1909, until 1951. It was directed at the Czech community in Baltimore and was published in Czech.  The newspaper was founded and first published by Vaclav Joseph Shimek, who also founded the Grand Lodge Č.S.P.S. of Baltimore. After 1929, the newspaper was edited by the Rev. Frank Novak and published by August Klecka.

Baltimore's Enoch Pratt Free Library maintains a partial archive of the Telegraf on microfilm in its Periodicals Department Collection. The Telegraf is also available on microfilm at the Center for Research Libraries, the Maryland State Archives, and the Franklin D. Roosevelt Presidential Library and Museum.

See also
History of the Czechs in Baltimore

References

External links
 Newsletter with clipping of Telegraf article Newsletter clipping from Sokoletter 
 Czech and Slovak Press in America

1909 establishments in Maryland
1951 disestablishments in Maryland
Czech-American culture in Baltimore
Czech-language newspapers published in the United States
Defunct newspapers published in Maryland
Defunct weekly newspapers
Newspapers published in Baltimore
Non-English-language newspapers published in Maryland
Publications established in 1909
Publications disestablished in 1951